An Lộc is a ward of Bình Long town, Bình Phước Province in the Southeast region of Vietnam.

References

Populated places in Bình Phước province